Statistics of Danish War Tournament in the 1944/1945 season.

Series 1, Phase 1, Group 1

Series 1, Phase 1, Group 2

Series 1, Phase 1, Group 3

Series 1, Phase 2
Boldklubben 1913 1-1 Esbjerg fB
Esbjerg fB 2-2 Boldklubben 1913
Esbjerg fB was awarded winner because of better points-average than B 1913.
Vejen SF 1-1 Boldklubben 1909
Boldklubben 1909 6-1 Vejen SF

Series 1, Phase 3
Aarhus Gymnastikforening 4-3 Boldklubben 1909
Boldklubben 1909 4-1 Aarhus Gymnastikforening
Aarhus Gymnastikforening was awarded winner because of better points-average than B 1909.
Esbjerg fB 1-2 Randers Sportsklub Freja
Randers Sportsklub Freja 5-0 Esbjerg fB

Series 2

Series 3

Quarterfinals
Randers Sportsklub Freja 1-2 Akademisk Boldklub
Aarhus Gymnastikforening 3-0 Kjøbenhavns Boldklub
Boldklubben Frem 2-0 Hobro IK
Boldklubben af 1893 3-3 Helsingør IF
Helsingør IF was awarded winner by lot.

Semifinals
Akademisk Boldklub 2-1 Boldklubben Frem
Helsingør IF 2-3 Aarhus Gymnastikforening

Final
Akademisk Boldklub 3-2 Aarhus Gymnastikforening

References
Denmark - List of final tables (RSSSF)

Top level Danish football league seasons
Den
Football